Usingeriessa is a genus of moths of the family Crambidae.

Species
 Usingeriessa brunneosuffusa (Hampson, 1917)
 Usingeriessa brunnildalis Dyar, 1906
 Usingeriessa decoralis (Dognin, 1905)
 Usingeriessa hemilitha (Meyrick, 1936)
 Usingeriessa nigrifusalis (Dognin, 1911)
 Usingeriessa onyxalis (Hampson, 1897)
 Usingeriessa psalmoidalis (Schaus, 1924)
 Usingeriessa sinitalis (Schaus, 1906)
 Usingeriessa symphonalis (Dyar, 1914)
 Usingeriessa tamanalis (Schaus, 1924)
 Usingeriessa trespasalis (Dyar, 1926)

References

 Natural History Museum Lepidoptera genus database

Acentropinae
Crambidae genera